John Wendell Thompson (born April 24, 1949) is an American technology executive who was the chair of Microsoft from 2014 until June 2021, and chair of Illumina since 2021. He is a former chief executive of Virtual Instruments, a vice-president at IBM and the former chief executive of Symantec. Thompson later became an independent director on the board of Microsoft, and in February 2014, was named chairman. He led the search for Microsoft's next CEO; as a result, Satya Nadella was selected.

Personal life 
Born at Fort Dix, New Jersey, Thompson attended John F. Kennedy High School in Riviera Beach, Florida (now Suncoast Community High School). He received a Bachelor of Business Administration from Florida A&M University in 1971 and an MBA from MIT Sloan School of Management in 1983. He has worked with Ducks Unlimited as an advocate for outdoor conservation.

Professional life 
Before moving on to become Symantec's CEO in 1999, Thompson's 28-year career with IBM Corporation included senior executive positions in sales, marketing and software development, and lastly as general manager of IBM Americas as well as membership in the company’s Worldwide Management Council.

In September 2002, Thompson was appointed to the National Infrastructure Advisory Committee (NIAC) which makes recommendations regarding the security of the critical infrastructure of the United States.

Thompson purchased a 20 percent share of the Golden State Warriors NBA team in 2005 along with three other Silicon Valley businessmen under the umbrella of the Bay Area Basketball Partners, L.L.C.

In April 2006, Forbes published a list of the most highly compensated CEOs.  Thompson was ranked #8 with a total compensation of US$71.84 million.

Thompson retired from his post as CEO of Symantec on April 4, 2009, turning the company's reins over to long-time Symantec executive Enrique Salem.

In 2010, Thompson was recognized for his commitment to education in Silicon Valley at the Silicon Valley Education Foundation's 2010 Pioneers & Purpose event. He received the Pioneer Business Leader award, which is awarded to individuals who have achieved outstanding accomplishments in business and education.

Thompson joined Microsoft’s board in 2012. On February 4, 2014, Thompson was appointed as chairman of Microsoft, succeeding Bill Gates. On the same day Nadella replaced Steve Ballmer as the Microsoft CEO. He stated that he joined the board because he had "admired Microsoft for many, many, many years". Thompson said he considered Microsoft to be "one of the true, iconic companies in our country".

Board memberships
 Microsoft
 Illumina
 Illinois Governor's Human Resource Advisory Council
 Teach For America
 Illumio
 Liquid Robotics
 Rubrik
 Seismic Software
 Inxeption

Political activity 
Thompson was a supporter of Barack Obama's campaign during the 2008 election cycle. In January 2009, news sources reported that President-elect Obama was considering Thompson to fill the Secretary of Commerce post in the Obama administration. Ultimately, Senator Judd Gregg was chosen for the post but withdrew his name on February 12. Thompson again remained a potential candidate until the successful appointment of Gary Locke.

Speaker of the House Nancy Pelosi appointed Thompson to the Financial Crisis Inquiry Commission in 2009.

References

External links
 John W. Thompson-Chairman-Microsoft
 Stanford eCorner: John Thompson
 

1949 births
Living people
Florida A&M University alumni
MIT Sloan School of Management alumni
MIT Sloan Fellows
Directors of Microsoft
American technology chief executives
IBM employees
Gen Digital people
African-American business executives
American business executives
People from Fort Dix
21st-century African-American people
20th-century African-American people